George Edward Mackley  (born 1900 in Huntingdon, died 1983 in Tonbridge, Kent) was an English wood engraving artist.

Career
Educated at the Judd School in Tunbridge, Kent, Mackley trained as a teacher of art at Goldsmiths' College, London, specializing in painting and etching. In 1935, he learned basic wood engraving technique from Noel Rooke.

Mackley's book Wood Engraving, published in 1948, remains one of the leading manuals of engraving techniques. In A History of British Wood Engraving (1978) Albert Garrett described him as ‘a phenomenon in British engraving. A few square centimetres of Mackley is more charged with aesthetic energy, emotion and precision than many artists can muster in a lifetime [...] He could not tolerate bad or weak craftsmanship under any circumstances; bad draughtsmanship met with short shrift from him. He makes no claims to being a creative artist and always stresses that he is primarily a craftsman.'

He was made a Member of the Order of the British Empire in the 1983 New Year Honours.

Publications
 George Mackley's Picture Book, George Mackley, 1981, J.L. Carr, Publisher, Kettering England.
 Wood Engraving, George Mackley, Gresham Books. 
 Confessions of a Woodpecker, George Mackley & H. Ecclestone, 1981, 
 George Mackley, Wood Engravings, 1995, Blond Fine Art. ASIN B001NFK4AU
 Monica Poole: Wood engraver, George Mackley & Graham L. Williams, 1984, Florin. 
 Wood Engravings with illustrations, George Mackley. ASIN B0014LW1T2

References

Further reading
 Monica Poole, George Mackley Wood Engraver (1981, Gresham Press)
Colin Campbell, The Mystery of Mackley (Country Life. 10 November 1988) pp. 136–138.

External links

Mackley Biography
Examples of Mackley engravings

1900 births
1983 deaths
English artists
British illustrators
English wood engravers
People from Huntingdon
Members of the Order of the British Empire
20th-century engravers